Nebraska Peaks is a scattered group of peaks and nunataks which lie east of Gaussiran Glacier and Merrick Glacier in the east part of Britannia Range. Named by Advisory Committee on Antarctic Names (US-ACAN) after the University of Nebraska, Lincoln, which was the location of the Ross Ice Shelf Project Management Office, 1972–77. Several features in the group have been named after RISP personnel.

Mountains of Oates Land
University of Nebraska–Lincoln